All Is Well is the second album by the singer and multi-instrumentalist Sam Amidon, released in 2008. It was produced and mixed by Valgeir Sigurðsson at Greenhouse Studios in Reykjavik and released on the Bedroom Community label. The album features Amidon's reworkings of traditional folk songs (mostly Appalachian), with chamber-orchestra arrangements by composer Nico Muhly and additional contributions from violist Eyvind Kang, electronic musician Ben Frost, and percussionists Aaron Siegel and Stefan Amidon.

Background and recording 

Amidon had recorded his first album of songs, But This Chicken Proved Falsehearted, with his childhood friend Thomas Bartlett, at their apartment in Harlem. Bartlett gave a copy of the as-yet-unreleased Chicken songs to his friend Nico Muhly, who in turn brought the recordings to Iceland, where he passed along copies to Bjork and producer Valgeir Sigurdsson, both of whom Muhly was collaborating with on various projects.

Upon hearing Amidon's music, Sigurðsson and Muhly, who were forming the Bedroom Community label with electronic composer Ben Frost, invited Amidon to come to Reykjavik for the 2006 Airwaves Festival. One night during the visit, Amidon put down the basic tracks for what was to become All Is Well, late at night, with Valgeir engineering. As with Amidon's first album, the material for the songs drew from traditional folk sources such as Dock Boggs and Bessie Jones, with the music and song structures reworked dramatically by Amidon. Nico Muhly's chamber-orchestra arrangements were scored for brass, woodwinds, and strings.

Critical reception 

All Is Well received a positive reception from critics. David Fricke, writing in Rolling Stone Magazine, said that “In an era of overheated Nick Drake comparisons, Amidon is eerily close to the real thing, singing in a fragile but certain tenor against the deep breath and soft sweep of Nico Muhly’s orchestrations. A better analogy is the big quiet in Björk’s Vespertine and Medúlla albums. Producer Valgeir Sigurðsson worked on both records; he conjures a similar, pregnant resonance here around Amidon’s voice and plucked-wire guitar — a public domain that is all inner space.” Musician Glen Hansard has written that the album “brings me huge comfort – it speaks across time somehow. Sam has taken some very old traditional folksongs and reworked them into new and delicate phrasings… I revisit this album over and over again.”

Track listing 
 "Sugar Baby" – 5:24
 "Little Johnny Brown" – 4:30
 "Saro" – 3:23
 "Wild Bill Jones" – 5:28
 "Wedding Dress" – 4:34
 "Fall On My Knees" – 4:18
 "Little Satchel" – 4:18
 "O Death" – 5:17
 "Prodigal Son" – 6:19
 "All Is Well" – 4:25

Personnel 

 Sam Amidon: voice, banjo, acoustic guitar, electric guitar, fiddle on 6
 Nico Muhly: piano, arrangements
 Stefan Amidon: drums on 4 and 5
 Ben Frost: programming on 2, bass on 6
 Aaron Siegel: percussive textures on 2 and 10, glockenspiel on 10 
 Morse: voice on 7 
 Eyvind Kang: viola on 2 and 9 
 Valgeir Sigurðsson – electronics, bass, harmonium, percussion on 2 and 6
 Helgi Hrafn Jónsson – trombone

Produced, recorded and mixed by Valgeir Sigurðsson
Wind/brass/string arrangements by Nico Muhly

References

External links 
 Dusted Magazine Album Review
 CMJ New Music Monthly Album Review
 Touching Extremes Album Review
 Rolling Stone Magazine Album Review – Fricke's Pick

2008 albums
Sam Amidon albums
Bedroom Community albums